Daniel Ściślak (born 13 March 2000) is a Polish professional footballer who plays as a midfielder for Ekstraklasa side Górnik Zabrze.

Club career

FK Pohronie
On 6 August 2021, Ściślak's loan at Žiar nad Hronom-based Pohronie of the Slovak Fortuna Liga was announced. Ściślak was to spend a year in the club, where he was to join Aleksander Paluszek, who was loaned there from Górnik Zabrze earlier.

Ściślak made his league debut for Pohronie against then yet-undefeated Žilina at pod Dubňom on 8 August 2021. He was featured in the starting line-up, with his team trailing after a first-minute goal by Timotej Jambor and two second-half strikes by Vahan Bichakhchyan, with the sole goal for Pohronie scored by Ladji Mallé.

References

External links

2000 births
Living people
People from Jastrzębie-Zdrój
Polish footballers
Poland under-21 international footballers
Association football midfielders
Górnik Zabrze players
FK Pohronie players
Chojniczanka Chojnice players
III liga players
II liga players
Ekstraklasa players
Slovak Super Liga players
Expatriate footballers in Poland
Slovak expatriate sportspeople in Poland